Papyrus 117 (in the Gregory-Aland numbering), designated by siglum 𝔓117, is a copy of a small part of the New Testament in Greek. It is a papyrus manuscript of the Second Epistle to the Corinthians. The surviving texts of 2 Corinthians are verses 7:6-8,9-11, they are in a fragmentary condition.

The text is written in one column per page, in 11 lines per page.

The manuscript palaeographically has been assigned by the INTF to the 4th-century (or 5th-century).

 Location 
The codex currently is housed at the library of the University of Hamburg at Hamburg with the shelf number Inv. NS 1002.

See also 
 List of New Testament papyri
 Second Epistle to the Corinthians: chapter 7

References

Further reading 

 M. Salvo, Un nuovo frammento della seconda lettera di Paolo ai Corinzi Analecta papyrologica 13 (2001), pp. 19–21.

External links 
 "Continuation of the Manuscript List" Institute for New Testament Textual Research, University of Münster. Retrieved April 9, 2008 
 

New Testament papyri
4th-century biblical manuscripts
Second Epistle to the Corinthians papyri